The former McGehee City Jail is a historic building at  South First and Pine Streets in McGehee, Arkansas.  The small single story brick building was built in 1908, and served as the city jail until 1935.  The building's roof is made of concrete, and it has three cells, each with a separate outside door.  All openings in the building are covered with heavy metal bars, and the doors are solid metal.  Even though this building has sat vacant since 1935, it has survived the jail that was built to replace it.

The building was listed on the National Register of Historic Places in 2011.

See also
National Register of Historic Places listings in Desha County, Arkansas

References

Jails on the National Register of Historic Places in Arkansas
Government buildings completed in 1908
Buildings and structures in Desha County, Arkansas
National Register of Historic Places in Desha County, Arkansas
1908 establishments in Arkansas